Sulaposten (The Sula Gazette) is a local Norwegian newspaper published in the municipality of Sula in Møre og Romsdal county. The newspaper's editorial office is in Langevåg. Sulaposten is a weekly newspaper containing local news and it is published every Thursday. It was launched in 1946. The paper's editor is Odd Solnørdal.

Circulation
According to the Norwegian Audit Bureau of Circulations and National Association of Local Newspapers, Sulaposten has had the following annual circulation:
2006: 2,470
2007: 2,465
2008: 2,414
2009: 2,476
2010: 2,453
2011: 2,316
2012: 2,316
2013: 2,367
2014: 2,304
2015: 2,290
2016: 2,194

References

External links
Sulaposten homepage

Newspapers published in Norway
Norwegian-language newspapers
Sula, Møre og Romsdal
Mass media in Møre og Romsdal
Publications established in 1946
1946 establishments in Norway